Thigul is a village in Gajwel constituency of Medak district in the Indian state of Telangana.

Villages in Medak district